William Caldwell was an American football player and coach. He served as the head football coach at Haskell Institute—now known as Haskell Indian Nations University—in Lawrence, Kansas for one season, in 1910, and Muskingum College—now known as Muskingum University in New Concord, Ohio for one season, in 1911, compiling a career college football coaching record of 2–13. Caldwell played college football for three seasons, from 1907 to 1909, at the University of Kansas.

Playing career
Caldwell was a three-time letter winner at the University of Kansas, playing tackle and end.

Coaching career
Caldwell's first coaching job was as the head football coach at Haskell Institute—now known as Haskell Indian Nations University—in Lawrence, Kansas in 1910. 

In 1911, he served as the head football coach at Muskingum College—now known as Muskingum University—in New Concord, Ohio.

Later life
In 1914, Caldwell worked as a teacher at West Technical High School in Cleveland, Ohio.

Head coaching record

References

Year of birth missing
Year of death missing
20th-century American educators
American football ends
American football tackles
Educators from Ohio
Haskell Indian Nations Fighting Indians football coaches
Kansas Jayhawks football players
Muskingum Fighting Muskies football coaches